Aoueinat Zbel  is a town and commune in the Hodh Ech Chargui Region of south-eastern Mauritania.

In 2000 it had a population of 6,873.

References

External links
Official site

Communes of Hodh Ech Chargui Region